Hyperaldosteronism is a medical condition wherein too much aldosterone is produced by the adrenal glands, which can lead to lowered levels of potassium in the blood (hypokalemia) and increased hydrogen ion excretion (alkalosis).

This cause of mineralocorticoid excess is primary hyperaldosteronism reflecting excess production of aldosterone by adrenal zona glomerulosa. Bilateral micronodular hyperplasia is more common than unilateral adrenal adenoma.

Signs and symptoms
It can be asymptomatic, but these symptoms may be present:
 Fatigue
 Headache
 High blood pressure
 Hypokalemia
 Hypernatraemia
 Hypomagnesemia
 Intermittent or temporary paralysis
 Muscle spasms
 Muscle weakness
 Numbness
 Polyuria
 Polydipsia
 Tingling
 Metabolic alkalosis
 Nocturia
 Blurry Vision
 Dizziness/Vertigo

Cause
The causes of primary hyperaldosteronism are adrenal hyperplasia and adrenal adenoma (Conn's syndrome).
These cause hyperplasia of aldosterone-producing cells of the adrenal cortex resulting in primary hyperaldosteronism.
The causes of secondary hyperaldosteronism are accessory renal veins, fibromuscular dysplasia, reninoma, renal tubular acidosis, nutcracker syndrome, ectopic tumors, massive  ascites, left ventricular failure, and cor pulmonale.
These act either by decreasing circulating fluid volume or by decreasing cardiac output, with resulting increase in renin release leading to secondary hyperaldosteronism. Secondary hyperaldosteronism can also be caused by proximal renal tubular acidosis
Secondary hyperaldosteronism can also be a symptom of genetic conditions Bartter's Syndrome and Gitelman's Syndrome.

Diagnosis
When taking a blood test, the aldosterone-to-renin ratio is abnormally increased in primary hyperaldosteronism, and decreased or normal but with high renin in secondary hyperaldosteronism.

Types
In endocrinology, the terms 'primary' and 'secondary' are used to describe the abnormality (e.g., elevated aldosterone) in relation to the defect, i.e., the tumor's location. It also refers to causes that are genetic (primary) or due to another condition or influence (secondary).

Primary

Primary aldosteronism (hyporeninemic hyperaldosteronism) was previously thought to be most commonly caused by an adrenal adenoma, termed Conn's syndrome. However, recent studies have shown that bilateral idiopathic adrenal hyperplasia is the cause in up to 70% of cases. Differentiating between the two is important, as this determines treatment. Also, see congenital adrenal hyperplasia.
Adrenal carcinoma is an extremely rare cause of primary hyperaldosteronism.

Two familial forms have been identified: type I (dexamethasone suppressible), and type II, which has been linked to the 7p22 gene.

Features
 Hypertension
 Hypokalemia (e.g., may cause muscle weakness)
 Alkalosis

Investigations
 High serum aldosterone
 Low serum renin
 High-resolution CT abdomen

Management
 Adrenal adenoma: surgery
 Bilateral adrenocortical hyperplasia: aldosterone antagonist, e.g., spironolactone

Secondary
 Secondary hyperaldosteronism (also hyperreninism, or hyperreninemic hyperaldosteronism) is due to overactivity of the renin–angiotensin–aldosterone system (RAAS).

Secondary refers to an abnormality that indirectly results in pathology through a predictable physiologic pathway, i.e., a renin-producing tumor leads to increased aldosterone, as the body's aldosterone production is normally regulated by renin levels. One cause is a juxtaglomerular cell tumor. Another is renal artery stenosis, in which the reduced blood supply across the juxtaglomerular apparatus stimulates the production of renin. Likewise, fibromuscular dysplasia may cause stenosis of the renal artery, and therefore secondary hyperaldosteronism. Other causes can come from the tubules: low reabsorption of sodium (as seen in Bartter and Gitelman syndromes) will lead to hypovolemia/hypotension, which will activate the renin–angiotensin system (RAAS).

Secondary hyperaldosteronism can also be caused by excessive ingestion of licorice or other members of the Glycyrrhiza genus of plants that contain the triterpenoid saponin glycoside known as glycyrrhizin. Licorice and closely related plants are perennial shrubs, the roots of which are used in medicine as well as making candies and in cooking other desserts because of the sweet taste. Through inhibition of 11-beta-hydroxysteroid dehydrogenase type 2 (11-beta-HSD2), glycyrrhizin allows cortisol to activate mineralocorticoid receptors in the kidney. This severely potentiates mineralocorticoid receptor-mediated renal sodium reabsorbtion, due to much higher circulating concentrations of cortisol compared to aldosterone. This, in turn, expands the extracellular volume, increases total peripheral resistance and increases arterial blood pressure. The condition is termed pseudohyperaldosteronism.

Secondary hyperaldosterone can also be caused by a genetic mutation in the kidneys which causes sodium and potassium wasting.  These conditions can be referred to syndromes such as Bartter Syndrome and Gitelman Syndrome.

Treatment
Treatment includes removing the causative agent (such as licorice), a high-potassium, low-sodium diet (for primary) and high-sodium diet (for secondary), spironolactone and eplerenone, potassium-sparing diuretics that act as aldosterone antagonists, and surgery, depending on the cause. Secondary hyperaldosteronism may also be treated with cox2 inhibitors which cause water retention, sodium retention and potassium retention as well as raising blood pressure.  Bartter and Gitleman syndrome tend to cause low blood pressure in significant populations and treatment with blood pressure medications tend to lower the blood pressure even more.

Other animals

Cats can be affected by hyperaldosteronism. The most common signs in cats are muscle weakness and loss of eyesight, although only one of these signs may be present. Muscle weakness is due to low potassium concentrations in the blood, and signs of muscle weakness, such as being unable to jump, may be intermittent. High blood pressure causes either detachment of the retina, or blood inside the eye, which leads to loss of vision. Hyperaldosteronism caused by a tumor is treated by surgical removal of the affected adrenal gland.

See also
 Hypoaldosteronism
 Glucocorticoid remediable aldosteronism

References

External links
 Primary Hyperaldosteronism Nursing Management

Adrenal gland disorders